Mahendranath Gupta (14 July 1854 – 4 June 1932), (also famously known as শ্রীম, Master Mahashay, and M.), was a disciple of Ramakrishna (a great 19th-century Hindu mystic) and a great mystic himself. He was the author of Sri Sri Ramakrishna Kathamrita (5 vols.), a Bengali classic; in English, it is known as The Gospel of Sri Ramakrishna. He was also an early teacher to Paramahansa Yogananda, a famous 20th-century yogi, guru and philosopher. In his autobiography, Yogananda noted that Gupta ran a small boys' high school in Kolkata, and he recounted their visits, as they often traveled to the Dakshineshwar Kali Temple  together. Having a devotional nature, Gupta worshipped the Divine Mother in the form of Kali, and often reflected the wisdom of his guru Ramakrishna in his daily life and mannerisms. Yogananda reverentially regarded Gupta's spirituality, calling him an "Incarnation of purity" and "the greatest man of humility I ever knew."

Life

Birth and education 
Mahendranath was born to Madhusudan Gupta and Swarnamayi Devi in a Baidya family in the Shimuliya section of Calcutta of West Bengal. After elementary education at the Hare School, he attended Presidency College, receiving his B.A. in 1874. Gupta was a gifted student and performed consistently well until 1874 till he graduated from Presidency College. In 1874 he was married to Nikunja Devi, daughter of Thakur Charan Sen and a relative of Keshub Chandra Sen, a Brahmo Samaj leader. After some time working for the government and a merchant house, he began teaching English, Psychology, and Economics at various colleges. Eventually he became headmaster of Ishwar Chandra Vidyasagar's high school, where he was called "Master Mahashay"—just as he was often addressed in Ramakrishna's circle and later by Yogananda.

Meetings with Ramakrishna

As an adult, Mahendranath, like some of the other disciples of Ramakrishna, was connected with the Brahmo Samaj for several years. Mahendranath had lost his mother at a very early age and was experiencing domestic friction in the joint family. As the friction within the joint family increased, Mahendranath decided to commit suicide. At this critical juncture, Mahendranath's nephew took him to the temple garden of Dakshineswar Kali Temple, where Ramakrishna, a mystic and the chief priest of the Kali temple lived. It was here that Gupta met Ramakrishna for the first time and this meeting was a turning point in his life. Years later, when Mahendranath was asked about the greatest day in his life, he said, "the day I had my first darshan of Thakur [Ramakrishna] in February 1882." According to other traditional accounts, Mahendranath related that he may have met Ramakrishna for the first time when he was four years old and became separated from his mother while visiting the Dakshineswar Kali Temple. He began crying, and a blissful and youthful man came up and consoled him. He believed it to be Ramakrishna, who was then a priest at the Kali temple.

Sri Sri Ramakrishna Kathamrita 

M had the habit of maintaining a personal diary since the age of thirteen. M met Sri Ramakrishna in 1882 and, attracted by the latter's teachings, started to maintain a stenographic record of Sri Ramakrishna's conversations and actions in his diary, which finally took the form of a book Sri Sri Ramakrishna Kathamrita. Initially when M began writing the diaries, he had no plans of publication. Regarding his methodology M wrote,

In each of his Kathamrita entries, M records the date, time and place of the conversation. The title Kathamrita, literally "nectarine words" was inspired by verse 10.31.9 from the Vaishnava text, the Bhagavata Purana. Both Sri Ramakrishna's wife, Holy Mother Sarada Devi, and Swami Vivekananda later testified to Mahendranath's faithfulness to Sri Ramakrishna's words. The first four volumes were published in 1902, 1904, 1908 and 1910 respectively and the fifth volume in 1932, delayed because of M's health problems. The Kathamrita contains the conversations of Sri Ramakrishna from 19/26 February 1882 to 24 April 1886, during M's visits. The Kathamrita is regarded as a Bengali classic and revered among the followers as a sacred scripture. Famous translations of Kathamrita include works by Swami Nikhilananda(1942), and Dharma Pal Gupta.

Teacher to Paramahansa Yogananda
Paramahansa Yogananda, a 20th-century philosopher and a yogi, was a student of Mahendranath Gupta. Mahendranath moved to 50 Amherst Street in Calcutta, where he ran a small boys' high school. It was also formerly Paramahansa Yogananda's family home—a site especially poignant to Yogananda because it was the site of his mother's death. In his Autobiography of a Yogi, Yogananda dedicated an entire chapter to describing his friendship with Mahendranath, whom he referred to as "Master Mahasaya," which was along spiritual rather than academic lines. Yogananda described Mahendranath as having a "silky white beard and large lustrous eyes" and described his personality thus:
"His role in the world was humble, as befitted the greatest man of humility I ever knew. In this Amherst Street house, Master Mahasaya conducted a small high school for boys. No words of chastisement passed his lips; no rule and ferule maintained his discipline. Higher mathematics indeed were taught in these modest classrooms, and a chemistry of love absent from the textbooks. He spread his wisdom by spiritual contagion rather than impermeable precept. Consumed by an unsophisticated passion for the Divine Mother, the saint no more demanded the outward forms of respect than a child."
Yogananda went on to describe several seemingly miraculous experiences with Mahendranath. Later, Yogananda said about him that "I would roll on the ground where he'd walked, so great was my love for him. I felt that even that ground had been sanctified."

Later life and death 
In 1922, M. lived in Mihijam, a town 144 miles from Kolkata, for nine months.

In 1932, when the fifth Volume of Kathamrita was at the printers Mahendranath died at his home, now called Kathamrita Bhavan, located near the Thanthania Kali Temple in Calcutta. Kathamrita Bhavan is a pilgrimage place for followers of Ramakrishna due to numerous visits there by Ramakrishna and Sarada Devi, and several relics associated with their lives.

References

Bibliography

 (full book is 16 volumes)

External links

  
 Table of Contents for "M" – The Apostle and the Evangelist (16-volumes)
 Sources of Biographical Information about M.

Presidency University, Kolkata alumni
University of Calcutta alumni
Bengali people
19th-century Indian non-fiction writers
Writers from Kolkata
Ramakrishna Mission
Lay disciples of Ramakrishna
1854 births
1932 deaths
20th-century Indian non-fiction writers
Indian spiritual writers